Tepuidessus breweri is a member of the order Coleoptera (Beetles) in the family of water dwelling Dytiscidae beetles, and is the only species in the genus Tepuidessus.

References

Dytiscidae